The 2021 Metro Manila Film Festival (MMFF) is the 47th edition of the annual Metro Manila Film Festival. It is organized by the Metropolitan Manila Development Authority (MMDA).

Impact of the COVID-19 pandemic
The 2021 film festival was held to live audiences in cinemas after level alert measures in the Philippines were relaxed. Entries in the 2020 edition were made available through online streaming since cinemas were closed and not allowed to operate (with the exception of select cinemas in areas on Level 3).

Only around 300 movie theaters will be allowed to screen, down from the usual 900. Many cinemas were left deteriorated due to being unused for the past two years due to the pandemic-related closures. Theaters would only be allowed to operate at 50 percent capacity with only those vaccinated allowed to be admitted and food and drinks are prohibited (on Alert Level 2 and 3 areas) This is compounded by the impact of Typhoon Rai (Odette) which caused major power disruption in the Visayas and Mindanao areas.

Entries

Feature films
The number of entries for the Metro Manila Film Festival returned to eight for the 2021 edition. Unlike the previous edition, the number of entries were temporarily expanded to ten since the 2020 edition was held virtually. The deadline for entries was set on October 31, 2021. There were 19 film submissions. The eight entries were announced on November 12, 2021.

Short films
The MMFF, in partnership with Meta Philippines, launched the Facebook Creator Exhibition. Five short films by content creators, produced with the theme "lockdown", was made available for streaming on Facebook under the exhibition.

Parade of Stars
The Parade of Stars for the 2021 MMFF is a fluvial parade instead of the traditional motorcade; which is a first in the history of the film festival. Consequentially, ferry boats were used instead of floats on land-based motor vehicles. The event was held on December 19, 2021, despite rainy weather. The route covered the Pasig River and the cities of Makati and Pasig. This was done as a means to promote the Pasig River Ferry Service, which is operated by the Metropolitan Manila Development Authority (MMDA).

Awards

The Gabi ng Parangal of the 2021 Metro Manila Film Festival was held at the Samsung Hall of the SM Aura Premier in Taguig on December 27, 2021. The awards night was hosted by Giselle Sanchez.

The jury includes Manet Dayrit, Congresswoman Aloy Lim, and Senator Bong Go.

Major awards
Winners are listed first, highlighted in boldface, and indicated with a double dagger. Nominations are also listed if applicable.

Other awards
 Natatanging Gawad MMFF – Danilo Lim and Bienvenido Lumbera
 Manay Ichu Vera-Perez Maceda Memorial Award – Rosa Rosal

Short Film category
Special Jury Prize – Kandado of Pio Balbuena

Multiple awards

Multiple nominations

Box office gross
No official figures have been released. MMFF spokesperson Noel Ferrer dispute claims that the 2021 MMFF has underperformed box office due to controversy by the delaying of big blockbusters with Spider-Man: No Way Home and some child-friendly films citing that the opening day of 2021 MMFF earned a third of the total box office gross of the online 2020 MMFF edition. He claimed that the film festival entries were able to surpass the Philippine domestic gross of Hollywood films such as Eternals and the No Time to Die. By December 29, Ferrer said that the box office gross of the 2021 MMFF has already surpassed the earnings of the previous edition.

Notes

References

Metro Manila Film Festival
MMFF
MMFF
MMFF
MMFF
MMFF
December 2021 events in the Philippines
January 2022 events in the Philippines